Triton High School is a traditional public high school  which opened in October 1985, which currently houses 1,308 students in grades nine through twelve, and 126 instructional staff members. Triton is one of six high schools in the Harnett County School System.

Athletics
Triton offers the following sports:

Baseball
Basketball
Golf
Cheer leading
Cross Country
American Football
Softball
Tennis
Soccer
Swimming
Track and Field
Volleyball
Wrestling

Notable alumni
 Clayton White, National Football League player and college football coach
 Morgan Goff, National Womens Soccer League

References

External links
 https://www.harnett.k12.nc.us/o/th

Public high schools in North Carolina
Schools in Harnett County, North Carolina